Ioana Andrada Bortan (born 23 January 1989) is a Romanian football midfielder and manager currently under contract with Olimpia Cluj in the Romanian First League. She has played the Champions League with CFF Clujana and Olimpia, and she is a member of the Romanian national team.

References

1989 births
Living people
People from Sighișoara
Romanian women's footballers
Romania women's international footballers
Women's association football midfielders
FCU Olimpia Cluj players
CFF Clujana players